Henryk Paweł Dziewior (1948 – 7 August 2022) was a Polish entrepreneur and politician. He served as mayor of Katowice from 1994 to 1998.

Dziewior died on 7 August 2022, at the age of 74.

References

1948 births
2022 deaths
Polish politicians
20th-century Polish businesspeople
Politicians from Katowice